Pågatågen is an interurban railway system in Skåne County, Sweden, and is run by Skånetrafiken, the regional public transportation authority. The trains are operated by the contractor VR Sverige (owned by Finnish state operator VR Group). The network has 72 stations, of which 8 are in the Malmö Urban Area: Malmö C, Triangeln, Hyllie, Svågertorp, Persborg, Rosengård, Östervärn and Burlöv and 6 in the Helsingborg Urban Area: Helsingborg C, Maria, Påarp, Ramlösa, Rydebäck and Ödåkra.

Påg is a dialectal Scanian word for 'boy', and is used to indicate that the trains are local/regional, and tåg is Swedish for train. The trains consist of purple-coloured electric multiple units of the X61 model. The trains are named after famous local people, either real or fictional.

History

The first Pågatåg, an X11 EMU named Bombi Bitt (named after the character written by Fritiof Nilsson Piraten), left Malmö Central Station on January 9, 1983. Local trains in Sweden had historically been provided by state operator SJ, but opposition from director general Lars Petersson to Scanian local traffic resulted in a local federation of Scanian municipalities (SSK) seeking to begin providing their own rail services. 

Services were originally operated with SJ brown multiple units from the 1930s, and by 1983 trains from Malmö served Lund, Landskrona, Teckomatorp and Helsingborg. With the arrival of new and purple X11 units from ASEA the name and brand Pågatågen took shape. A naming contest had been held by the local radio channel Radio Malmöhus, and a set of male names had been chosen for the series, with the trains also gaining the name 'Pågatågen' due to this fact.

In 1988 responsibility for Pågatågen was transferred to Malmöhus County, as the expansion of services meant that Pågatågen had outgrown the abilities of SSK. With the merger of Malmöhus and Kristianstad counties into Skåne County responsibility was again transferred to Skånetrafiken, and services were extended into what was Kristianstad County, with services to Helsingborg extended to Ängelholm in 1999, services to Ystad extended to Tomelilla and Simrishamn in 2003 and services to Hässleholm and Kristianstad itself starting in 2007.

As the new train sets of the X61 class were being planned, names of women were to be used for the trains for the first time. These trains were playfully called 'Tösatåg' by both Skånetrafiken and the press, 'tös' meaning 'girl' in the Scanian dialect. In December 2009 the first of the new X61 train sets, 'Birgit Nilsson', left Malmö Central Station. The last service using the old model X11 was run on 8 September 2013.

Lines

As of December 2018, there are ten lines in the Pågatågen system. There are stops in three neighbouring counties: three stops in Blekinge County, two stops in Halland County and one stop in Kronoberg County.

Local trains from neighbouring Småland also operate within Scania on the route Växjö–Älmhult–Hässleholm.

Rolling stock

The Pågatåg rolling stock is owned by Skånetrafiken, although the operation (staff and licences etc.) is carried out by a subdivision of VR Group.

Pågatåg rolling stock under the first concession (1983–1997) were primarily of type X11 (with diesel Y1 railcars used on the then-non-electrified Malmö-Ystad line from 1990–1996), but as demand grew, other available train types had to be added to the roster. Some Bombardier Regina X52 type trainsets were rented from other train owners. The type X31, normally used for the Øresundståg traffic to Denmark, was also used sometimes. Subsequently, Skånetrafiken ordered 99 new Alstom Coradia X61 sets, a variant of the type used in Stockholm. Several of them have been used on revenue services since August 2010, and since 2013 they have taken over all services. Skånetrafiken attempted to sell most of the X11 trains during 2011, since they can no longer be used; they do not fulfill all the safety requirements for the City Tunnel in Malmö and had only a temporary exception from the rules, which also required extra staff.

Note that the rolling stock for the Øresundståg, outside of the Pågatåg concession, is of Class X31 only, and these trains are owned by Transitio (partially owned by Skånetrafiken), or by the Danish train operator DSB.

Tickets
For the Pågatågen trains as well as the Øresundståg, paper tickets or passes can be used but tickets bought on a mobile phone using Skånetrafiken's app are also valid. The paper tickets can be bought from machines at the stations. This is in contrast to buses where electronic contactless smartcards are used. The reason for the difference is that half of the Øresundståg rolling stock is owned by Danish DSB which does not want to install Swedish ticket machines.

See also

Öresund Trains
History of rail transport in Sweden
Rail transport in Sweden

References

External links

Rail transport in Skåne County
Regional rail in Sweden
Rail transport in the Øresund Region
1983 in rail transport
1983 establishments in Sweden